Ron James may refer to:

Ron James (comedian) (born 1958), Canadian stand-up comedian and actor
Ron James (cricketer) (1920–1983), Australian cricketer
Ron James (footballer, born 1907) (1907–1969), Australian rules footballer
Ron James (footballer, born 1933), Australian rules footballer
Ron James (footballer, born 1970) (1970–1990), Australian rules footballer
Ron James (mayor) (born 1928), American politician, first directly elected mayor of San Jose, California
Ron James (mountaineer), British mountain climber
Po James (Ronald James, born 1949), American football running back
Ron James (politician), former member of the Ohio House of Representatives
Ronald James, Welsh rugby league footballer of the 1960s and 1970s for Commonwealth XIII, and Halifax
Ronnie James (1917–1977), Welsh boxer of the 1930s and 1940s
Ron James (American football) (born 1964), American football coach